Collinsburg is a census-designated place located in Rostraver Township, Westmoreland County in the state of Pennsylvania, United States.  As of the 2010 census the population was 1,125 residents.

Demographics

References

Census-designated places in Westmoreland County, Pennsylvania
Census-designated places in Pennsylvania